Hamadryas belladonna, the belladonna cracker, is a species of cracker butterfly in the family Nymphalidae. It is endemic to Brazil.

References

Hamadryas (butterfly)
Lepidoptera of Brazil
Nymphalidae of South America
Butterflies described in 1865
Taxa named by Henry Walter Bates